The Shadow Out of Time is a novella by American 
horror fiction writer H. P. Lovecraft. Written between November 1934 and February 1935, it was first published in the June 1936 issue of Astounding Stories. The story describes time and space travel by mind transfer. The premise is that a person in a given place and time can switch bodies with someone who is elsewhere or elsewhen. Other writers have re-used this concept in later works, such as drinking tea from Red Forest leaves in the television series 12 Monkeys and long-range communication stones in the Stargate SG-1 television series. As with other Lovecraftian works, this story features otherworldy alien beings that are not simply variations on humans or other familiar terrestrial animals.

Plot
The Shadow Out of Time indirectly tells of the Great Race of Yith, an extraterrestrial species with the ability to travel through space and time. The Yithians accomplish this by switching bodies with hosts from the intended time and place.  The story implies that the effect, when seen from the outside, is similar to spiritual possession. The Yithians' original purpose was to study the history of various times and places, and they have amassed a "library city" that is filled with the past and future history of multiple races, including humans.  Ultimately the Yithians use their ability to escape the destruction of their planet in another galaxy by switching bodies with a race of cone-shaped plant beings who lived 150 million years ago on Earth. The cone-shaped entities (subsequently also known as the Great Race of Yith) lived in their vast library city in what would later become Australia's Great Sandy Desert.

The story is told through the eyes of Nathaniel Wingate Peaslee, an American living in the first decade of the 20th century, who is "possessed" by a Yithian. He fears he is losing his mind when he unaccountably sees strange vistas of other worlds and of the Yithian library city. He also feels himself being led about by these creatures and experiences how they live. When he is returned to his own body, he finds that those around him have judged him insane due to the actions of the Yithian that possessed his body. While he was experiencing a Yithian existence in Earth's ancient past, the Yithian occupying his body was experiencing a human one in the present day.

The narrator at first believes his episode and subsequent dreams to be the product of some kind of mental illness. His initial relief at discovering other cases like his throughout history is withered when he discovers that the other cases are too similar to his own to be without a connection.  The narrator's dreams become more vivid, and he becomes obsessed with archaeology and ancient manuscripts (as was the Yithian) – but lacks any sort of proof that would demonstrate whether he was (or is) simply mad.

He discovers that the Yithians on Earth died out eons ago (their civilization destroyed by a rival, utterly alien pre-human race described as "half-polypous" creatures) but the Yithian minds will inhabit new bodies on Earth after humanity is long gone.  His tenuously held sanity is challenged when he discovers the proof he seeks—and that not only do remains of the Yithians' past civilization still exist on Earth; but also still remaining are those who destroyed them. It is also mentioned that the current appearance of the Yithians is not the original; but one acquired during a previous mass-projection of the minds of their race when disaster beckoned, leaving the original inhabitants to die in the bodies of the Yithians.

Characters
Nathaniel Wingate Peaslee: The narrator of the story, a professor of political economy at Miskatonic University, and, from 1908 until 1913, a victim of the Great Race of Yith. He was born c. 1870.
There are autobiographical aspects to the character. The years of Peaslee's amnesia correspond to the timespan of Lovecraft's adolescent nervous breakdown, which forced him to drop out of high school and withdraw from society. During this period, Lovecraft suffered from facial tics, which may be reflected in the Yithian-possessed Peaslee's inability to control his facial muscles. The feeling Lovecraft described, upon returning to Providence after living in New York City for two years, that he was "awakening from the queer dream about being away from home" has been called "the cornerstone upon which Lovecraft built his masterpiece, 'The Shadow out of Time'." But An H. P. Lovecraft Encyclopedia, which calls Peaslee perhaps "the most thoroughly developed of HPL's characters", notes that there are parallels as well to Lovecraft's father, Winfield Scott Lovecraft, who also displayed eccentric behavior during a five-year period of madness.

Wingate Peaslee: Son of Nathaniel Peaslee, also a Miskatonic professor. He is described by his father as "the only member of my family who stuck to me after my queer amnesia of long ago, and the man best informed on the inner facts of my case."
William Dyer: A Miskatonic University geology professor who accompanies the expedition to Australia. See At the Mountains of Madness.

The story mentions a number of victims of the Yithians' mind-swapping whom Nathaniel Peaslee recalls talking with, including:

Titus Sempronius Blaesus: A Roman "who had been a quaestor in Sulla's time". Sulla first became Consul in 88 B.C. and was dictator of Rome 82-80 B.C. A quaestor was a Roman financial official; Sulla reformed the office and raised their number from ten to twenty.
Bartolomeo Corsi: A "12th century Florentine monk". This character also appears in Phillip O. Marsh's 1994 novel The Worm Shall Ye Fight!
Crom-Ya: A Cimmerian chief who lived c. 15,000 B.C. This is a homage to Lovecraft's friend Robert E. Howard, whose best-known creation, Conan the Barbarian, hailed from Cimmeria and worshipped Crom. In Fred L. Pelton's 1989 short story "The Sussex Manuscript", Crom-Ya is said to be a worshipper of Tsathoggua.
Khephnes: "An Egyptian of the 14th Dynasty, who told me the hideous secret of Nyarlathotep". The 14th dynasty was about 1700 B.C.
Nevil Kingston-Brown: An "Australian physicist...who will die in 2518 A.D."
Pierre-Louis Montagny: "An aged Frenchman of Louis XIII's time". Louis XIII was king of France from 1610 to 1643.
Nug-Soth: "A magician of the dark conquerors of 16,000 A.D."
S'gg'ha: A being from "the Star-headed vegetable carnivores of Antarctica."
Theodotides: A Greco-Bactrian official of 200 B.C.
James Woodville: "A Suffolk gentleman of Cromwell's day". Cromwell lived from 1599 to 1658, and was the English head of state from 1653 until his death.
Yiang-Li: "A philosopher from the cruel empire of Tsan-Chan, which is to come in 5,000 A.D." Tsan-Chan is first mentioned by Lovecraft in the story "Beyond the Wall of Sleep".

Inspiration
S. T. Joshi points to Berkeley Square, a 1933 fantasy film, as an inspiration for The Shadow Out of Time: "Lovecraft saw this film four times in late 1933; its portrayal of a man of the 20th century who somehow merges his personality with that of his 18th-century ancestor was clearly something that fired Lovecraft's imagination, since he had written a story on this very theme himself—the then unpublished The Case of Charles Dexter Ward (1927)." Lovecraft called the film "the most weirdly perfect embodiment of my own moods and pseudo-memories that I have ever seen—for all my life I have felt as if I might wake up out of this dream of an idiotic Victorian age and insane jazz age into the sane reality of 1760 or 1770 or 1780." Lovecraft noted some conceptual problems in Berkeley Square'''s depiction of time travel, and felt that he had resolved these flaws in his novella.

Other literary models for The Shadow Out of Time include H. B. Drake's The Shadowy Thing (originally published as The Remedy in 1925), about a person who has the ability to transfer his personality to another body; Henri Beraud's Lazarus (1925), in which the protagonist develops an alter ego during a lengthy period of amnesia; and Walter de la Mare's The Return (1910), featuring a character who seems to be possessed by a mind from the 18th century.

A similar plot was used in the story Les Posthumes (1802) by Nicolas-Edme Rétif, where the character the Duke of Multipliandre has the power to project his soul into other humans and through time and space across the universe.

Reaction

Lovecraft critic Lin Carter calls The Shadow Out of Time Lovecraft's "single greatest achievement in fiction", citing "its amazing scope and sense of cosmic immensitude, the gulfs of time it opens, [and] the titanic sweep of the narrative", while horror author and critic Ramsey Campbell describes it as "awe-inspiring". Swedish Lovecraft expert Martin Andersson named the story as one of his four favorites and called it Lovecraft's "magnum opus". Lovecraft himself was dissatisfied with the effort, so much so that he mailed the original manuscript to August Derleth without taking a copy for himself.

Cinescape Magazine rated the story to be one of the top 10 Science Fiction and Fantasy Books of 2001. Mark Squirek wrote in the New York Journal of Books that, "The complexity of Mr. Lovecraft’s story is enhanced by the art showcasing what he wrote—a great way for a novice reader to discover the work of H. P. Lovecraft." Also, Publishers Weekly wrote, "Lovecraftians will hail the publication of H.P. Lovecraft's The Shadow Out of Time."

Adaptations
The H. P. Lovecraft Historical Society has produced Dark Adventure Radio Theatre: The Shadow Out of Time, a Dark Adventure Radio Theatre adaptation of the story, similar to their previous adaptations (Dark Adventure Radio Theatre: At the Mountains of Madness and Dark Adventure Radio Theatre: The Dunwich Horror).The Shadow Out of Time was adapted by artist Larry Todd as "The Shadow From the Abyss" in Skull Comics No. 5 (Last Gasp, 1972).The Shadow Out of Time was adapted by cartoonist Matt Howarth in the book Graphic Classics: H.P. Lovecraft (Graphic Classics, Volume 4) and is included in both the first (2002) and second (2007) editions.The Shadow Out of Time was adapted by cartoonist I. N. J. Culbard in a graphic novel of the same title, published in 2013.
The protagonist of the 2006 video game Call of Cthulhu: Dark Corners of the Earth is revealed to have been sired by a Yithian who mind-swapped with his father.
Manga artist Gou Tanabe has adapted several of H.P. Lovecraft's stories into graphic novels, including The Shadow Out of Time.

References

Sources
 Definitive version.
Lin Carter, Lovecraft: A Look Behind the Cthulhu Mythos.
S. T. Joshi and David E. Schultz, An H. P. Lovecraft Encyclopedia.
David E. Schultz, "Lovecraft's New York Exile", Black Forbidden Things'', Robert M. Price, ed.

External links 

 
 Hippocampus Press page with links to reviews

1936 American novels
Fiction about body swapping
Cthulhu Mythos novels
American fantasy novels
Fiction set in 1935
Novels by H. P. Lovecraft
Novels set in Australia
Novels set in Massachusetts
Novels about time travel
Works originally published in Analog Science Fiction and Fact
Weird fiction novels